Rembrandt Hall is a historic home located at Keeseville in Essex County, New York.  It was built in 1851 and is a -story brick Gothic Revival style cottage.  It consists of a central 2-story entrance pavilion flanked by identical bay windows. The interior features a noted rounded central staircase.  It was designed by architect Isaac G. Perry for Emma Clara Peale Barton, wife of Caleb D. Barton and daughter of artist Rembrandt Peale.

It was listed on the National Register of Historic Places in 1983.

References

Houses on the National Register of Historic Places in New York (state)
Gothic Revival architecture in New York (state)
Houses completed in 1851
Houses in Essex County, New York
1851 establishments in New York (state)
National Register of Historic Places in Essex County, New York